Isaac Jean-Paul (born February 4, 1993) is a visually impaired American Paralympic athlete. He won the bronze medal in the men's long jump T13 event at the 2020 Summer Paralympics held in Tokyo, Japan.

In 2017, he set a new world record of 2.17 m in the men's high jump T13 event at the World Para Athletics Championships held in London, United Kingdom. He also won the bronze medal in the men's long jump T13 event.

In 2019, he qualified to represent the United States at the 2020 Summer Paralympics after winning the silver medal in the men's long jump T13 event at the 2019 World Para Athletics Championships held in Dubai, United Arab Emirates. In this event, he also set a new personal best of 7.18m.

References

External links 
 

Living people
1993 births
Paralympic athletes with a vision impairment
Paralympic track and field athletes of the United States
American male high jumpers
American male long jumpers
World Para Athletics Championships winners
Athletes (track and field) at the 2020 Summer Paralympics
Medalists at the 2020 Summer Paralympics
Paralympic bronze medalists for the United States
Sportspeople from Evanston, Illinois
Track and field athletes from Illinois
Lewis Flyers athletes
People from Gurnee, Illinois
21st-century American people
American blind people